Mordellistena daturae is a beetle in the genus Mordellistena of the family Mordellidae. It was described in 1922 by Blair.

References

daturae
Beetles described in 1922